The U.S. state of Indiana first required its residents to register their motor vehicles in 1905. Registrants provided their own license plates for display until July 1, 1913, when the state began to issue plates.

Plates are currently issued by the Indiana Bureau of Motor Vehicles (BMV). Only rear plates have been required since 1956.

Passenger baseplates

1913 to 1980
The 1955 (dated 1956) issue was the first Indiana license plate that complied with these standards.

1981 to present

Optional types

Non-passenger plates

Organizational and collegiate plates
Indiana issues a large number of organizational and collegiate license plates. A portion of the fees for these plates is given to the respective organization or college.

Organizational plates

Collegiate plates

Military plates
Indiana also issues several military-related license plates. Most are available for veterans only.

Temporary plates

New plate prefixing
Starting in 2010 special plates such as the handicapped, POW, National Guard, Disabled American Veteran that use the background of the standard plates will no longer use just numbers. Instead they will now use a predetermined prefix of three numbers and one or two suffix letters depending on if they have one or two prefix numbers. In all the max total characters will amount to six and, except the Disabled American Veteran and Purple Heart plate will use the background of the standard plate. Starting in 2015, the colors of these plates, with the exception of the Hoosier Veteran and Purple Heart plates, will invert, producing plates with dark blue serials on a white background.

 Recreational Vehicles - R123A or R123AB
 Handicapped -  D123A or D123AB  C123A or C123AB  H123A or H123AB 
 Disabled American Veteran - DH123A or DF123A
 Pearl Harbor Survivor - PH1234
 Ex-Prisoner of War - PW123A
 National Guard - NG123A
 Purple Heart - PH123A or PH123 (Handicapped) 
 Gold Star Family - GF123

Starting in 2012 veterans of each of the five branches of the armed forces will be able, for an extra $15, to obtain a plate with the seal of the Army, Navy, Air Force, Marine Corps or Coast Guard beginning in 2012.  The $15 fee will benefit the state's Military Family Relief Fund.

 Air Force Veteran - VA1234 or VA123A
 Army Veteran - AV1234 or AV123A
 Coast Guard Veteran - CV1234 or CV123A
 Marine Corps Veteran - VM1234 or VM123A
 Navy Veteran - NY1234, NY123A, or FL1234
 Merchant Marine Veteran - MM1234

Trucks and trailers
Indiana maintains separate plates for trucks, trailers, tractors/trailers, and farm vehicles. Except for farm and motorcycle vehicles, the plates follow an eight character AB123CDE format. All following plates use a plain white background

 Standard Truck - TK123KAA, TK123LAA, TK123MAA, TK123NAA, TK123OAA, TK123PAA
 Tractor Rig - SP123ABC
 Farm Vehicles -  F123AB 
 Small Trailer - TR123LAA
 Semi Trailer - ST123ABC
 Motorcycle Standard - M123AB

County coding
From 1963 through 2008, the Indiana Bureau of Motor Vehicles issued standard passenger plates bearing a one- or two-digit prefix identifying the county in which the vehicle was registered. These prefixes were assigned to each county in alphabetical order, beginning with 1 for Adams County and ending with 92 for Whitley County; prefixes 93 through 99 were reserved as overflow for the state's two most populous counties, Marion (93, 95, 97, 98 and 99) and Lake (94 and 96).

In each county, serials consisted of the prefix followed by one letter and up to four digits, progressing sequentially. In 1992, Allen County reached 29999 and subsequently introduced a new format with the prefix followed by two letters and three digits (beginning with 2101); this format was later used in St. Joseph (71), Hamilton (29), Elkhart (20) and Vanderburgh (82) Counties.

Following the introduction of multi-year plates in 1981, plates with serials containing numbers above 100 were revalidated with decals, while those with serials containing numbers 1 through 100 continued to be issued annually.

In 2008, new serial formats were introduced with the white-on-blue torch base, consisting of three digits followed by one, two or three random letters. However, the county number system was retained through the use of decals at the top of each plate displaying both the county number and name, with the overflow numbers for Marion and Lake Counties discontinued.

The no-cost alternative "In God We Trust" plate introduced in 2007 featured the county number on a sticker at the bottom right corner of the plate. The revised "In God We Trust" plate, introduced in 2012, has the number screened onto the bottom right corner; this technique was subsequently adopted on standard passenger plates, beginning with the Bicentennial base in 2013. Since 2013, the following numbers appear at the bottom corner of every plate issued in the state from passenger plates, to truck plates, municipal, even motorcycle plates.

List of county numbers

 01 - Adams
 02 - Allen
 03 - Bartholomew
 04 - Benton
 05 - Blackford
 06 - Boone
 07 - Brown
 08 - Carroll
 09 - Cass
 10 - Clark
 11 - Clay
 12 - Clinton
 13 - Crawford
 14 - Daviess
 15 - Dearborn
 16 - Decatur
 17 - DeKalb
 18 - Delaware
 19 - Dubois
 20 - Elkhart
 21 - Fayette
 22 - Floyd
 23 - Fountain
 24 - Franklin
 25 - Fulton
 26 - Gibson
 27 - Grant
 28 - Greene
 29 - Hamilton
 30 - Hancock
 31 - Harrison
 32 - Hendricks
 33 - Henry
 34 - Howard
 35 - Huntington
 36 - Jackson
 37 - Jasper
 38 - Jay
 39 - Jefferson
 40 - Jennings
 41 - Johnson
 42 - Knox
 43 - Kosciusko
 44 - LaGrange
 45 - Lake
 46 - LaPorte
 47 - Lawrence
 48 - Madison
 49 - Marion
 50 - Marshall
 51 - Martin
 52 - Miami
 53 - Monroe
 54 - Montgomery
 55 - Morgan
 56 - Newton
 57 - Noble
 58 - Ohio
 59 - Orange
 60 - Owen
 61 - Parke
 62 - Perry
 63 - Pike
 64 - Porter
 65 - Posey
 66 - Pulaski
 67 - Putnam
 68 - Randolph
 69 - Ripley
 70 - Rush
 71 - Saint Joseph
 72 - Scott
 73 - Shelby
 74 - Spencer
 75 - Starke
 76 - Steuben
 77 - Sullivan
 78 - Switzerland
 79 - Tippecanoe
 80 - Tipton
 81 - Union
 82 - Vanderburgh
 83 - Vermillion
 84 - Vigo
 85 - Wabash
 86 - Warren
 87 - Warrick
 88 - Washington
 89 - Wayne
 90 - Wells
 91 - White
 92 - Whitley

Overflow numbers (until 2008)

 93, 95, 97, 98, 99 - Marion
 94, 96 - Lake

Renewal date tags
In the past, Indiana colored its due date tags by month. Another change to the plate system is that there are only four colors of tags which are the same regardless of the month, whether it be January, June, or December, another change because Indiana used to only issue month tags from January to October. These are all found on the top left corner of an Indiana plate based on the first three letters of the last name of the owner. Note: Business owned vehicles have black tags that expire 1-31 regardless of name.

 01-07
 02-07
 03-07
 04-07
 05-07
 06-07
 07-07
 08-07
 09-07
 10-07
 11-07
 12-07
 01-14
 02-14
 03-14
 04-14
 05-14
 06-14
 07-14
 08-14
 09-14
 10-14
 11-14
 12-14
 01-21
 02-21
 03-21
 04-21
 05-21
 06-21
 07-21
 08-21
 09-21
 10-21
 11-21
 12-21
 01-28
 02-28
 03-28
 04-28
 05-28
 06-28
 07-28
 08-28
 09-28
 10-28
 11-28
 12-28

References

External links
 Indiana license plates, 1969–present
  Jacob's License Plate Website, the online home of the Jacob A. Newkirk Historic License Plate Collection (will close October 26, 2009 due to the shutdown of all Yahoo! GeoCities free web sites)
 Jacob's License Plate Blog, the new online home of the Jacob A. Newkirk Historic License Plate Collection

Indiana
Transportation in Indiana
Indiana transportation-related lists